The Episcopal Church (TEC) is governed by a General Convention and consists of 99 dioceses in the United States proper, plus eleven dioceses in other countries or outlying U.S. territories and the diocese of Convocation of Episcopal Churches in Europe, for a total of 2 dioceses.

A diocese, which is led by a bishop, includes all the parishes and missions within its borders, which usually correspond to a state or a portion of a state. Some dioceses includes portions of more than one state. For example, the Diocese of Washington includes the District of Columbia and part of Maryland.

Overview

The naming convention for the domestic dioceses, for the most part, is after the state in which they are located or a portion of that state (for example, Northern Michigan or West Texas).

Usually (though not always), in a state where there is more than one diocese, the area where the Episcopal Church (or Church of England before the American Revolution) started in that state is the diocese that bears the name of that state. For example, the Church of England's first outpost in what is now Georgia was in Savannah, hence the Diocese of Georgia is based in Savannah.

There are, however, many dioceses named for their see city or another city in the diocese. A few are named for a river, island, valley or other geographical feature. The list below includes the see city in parentheses if different from the name of the diocese or unclear from its name.

The see city usually has a cathedral, often the oldest parish in that city, but some dioceses do not have a cathedral. The dioceses of Iowa and Minnesota each have two cathedrals. Occasionally the diocesan offices and the cathedral are in separate cities.

Provinces
The dioceses are grouped into nine provinces, the first eight of which, for the most part, correspond to regions of the U.S. Province IX is composed of dioceses in Latin America. Province II and Province VIII also include dioceses outside of the U.S.

Unlike in many churches of the Anglican Communion, in which provinces are helmed by a primate or presiding bishop from the clergy, provinces of TEC are led by lay executive directors or presidents. Decisions are made at each province's Synod of the Province, consisting of a House of Bishops and House of Deputies. Lay and clergy Deputies are elected, two from each diocese.

Provinces of TEC are not to be confused with provinces of the Anglican Communion, as TEC itself is one such province of the Communion.

List of provinces and their dioceses

Former provinces and dioceses
 Diocese of Central America, now part of the Anglican Communion
 Episcopal Diocese of Duluth (1907–1944, reunited with Diocese of Minnesota)
 Episcopal Eastern Diocese (1811–1843, split into the dioceses of Massachusetts, Vermont, New Hampshire, Maine, and Rhode Island)
 Episcopal Church in North Texas (1983-2022, reunited with Diocese of Texas)
 Diocese of Mexico (1973–1985, now part of the Anglican Communion)
 Diocese of the Philippines (1990, now autonomous province)
 Diocese of Quincy (1877–2013, merged with the diocese of Chicago following a schism)
 Diocese of South Florida (1922–1969, divided into dioceses of Central Florida, Southwest Florida, and Southeast Florida)
 Diocese of Western Colorado (1892–1898, 1907–1919, merged into Diocese of Colorado) 
 Missionary District of Western Nebraska (1889–1943, merged into diocese of Nebraska)
 Missionary District of Eastern Oklahoma (1911–1918, merged into diocese of Oklahoma)

Military diocese
 Episcopal Diocese of the Armed Services and Federal Ministries

Dioceses no longer in existence
Duluth reunited with Minnesota in 1943.
Eastern Diocese comprised all of New England except Connecticut. By 1843, Vermont, New Hampshire, Maine and Rhode Island had their own dioceses and the Eastern Diocese became Massachusetts
Analogously, the Episcopal Diocese of Illinois formerly comprised all of Illinois. In 1877, the diocese was divided into three parts, with the Episcopal Diocese of Chicago assuming the legal succession of the former statewide diocese, and the Episcopal Diocese of Springfield and the Episcopal Diocese of Quincy becoming independent. Quincy reunited with Chicago in 2013. 
South Florida see Central Florida, Southeast Florida and Southwest Florida
The Platte, renamed Laramie, Kearney, and Western Nebraska. In 1943 recombined with Nebraska
Western Colorado reunited with Colorado in 1919.
Episcopal Church in North Texas reunited with Episcopal Diocese of Texas in 2022.

Formerly missionary districts
The following were founded as missionary districts of the Episcopal Church but are now full, independent Provinces of the Anglican Communion.
The Episcopal Church of the Philippines, established during the American 
Colonial Era of the Philippines
The Anglican Province of Mexico 
The Anglican Episcopal Church of Brazil 
The Anglican Church in Central America, formed from the missionary dioceses of Guatemala, El Salvador, Costa Rica, Nicaragua, and Panama,

See also
 List of the Episcopal cathedrals of the United States
 List of Episcopal bishops of the United States

Notes

References

External links

Browse by Province — Provides a short description, map, and list of dioceses for each of the nine provinces.
Cathedrals of California

 
Episcopal